Holthe is a hamlet in the Dutch province of Drenthe. It is a part of the municipality of Midden-Drenthe, and lies about 14 km north of Hoogeveen.

The statistical area "Holthe", which can also include the surrounding countryside, has a population of around 150.

References

Midden-Drenthe
Populated places in Drenthe